Giuseppe Brotzu (Cagliari, 24 January 1895 – Cagliari, 8 April 1976) was an Italian pharmacologist and politician.

Biography 
Giuseppe Brotzu was born in Ghilarza, a town of the Province of Oristano, Sardinia.
He graduated from the University of Cagliari, Sardinia in (1919) and later completed the specialization in Hygiene at University of Siena in 1922. He graduated in Medicine and Surgery at the University of Bologna in 1925.

He became a professor at the University of Modena and Reggio Emilia in 1932, and between 1939 and 1943 he was the director of University of Cagliari.

Scientific research
Brotzu is recognized as the discoverer of the cephalosporin-based antibiotics, that were first isolated from cultures of Cephalosporium (now known as Acremonium)  in 1948. He noticed that these cultures produced substances that were effective against Salmonella typhi, the cause of typhoid fever, which had beta-lactamase. 
He was awarded the Laurea ad honorem at the University of Oxford in 1971, and was a candidate also for the Nobel Prize.

Political career

Giuseppe Brotzu was elected President of Sardinia in 1955, and Mayor of Cagliari in 1960.

Bibliography
 G. Bo, «BROTZU, Giuseppe». In: Dizionario Biografico degli Italiani, Vol. XXXIV, Roma: Istituto della Enciclopedia Italiana, 1987 (on-line)
 Roberto Paracchini (2002). Il signore delle Cefalosporine (Demos). .
 Bo G (Jan-Feb 1999). Un ricordo del prof. Giuseppe Brotzu. Ann Ig 11 (1): 3-9. .

See also
 Cephalosporin
 Discovery and development of cephalosporins

References

1895 births
1976 deaths
Presidents of Sardinia
People from Cagliari
Italian pharmacologists
Members of the Regional Council of Sardinia
University of Cagliari alumni
Mayors of Cagliari